Visnagin is an organic chemical compound with the molecular formula C13H10O4 It is a furanochromone, a compound derivative of chromone (1,4-benzopyrone) and furan.

History
Ammi visnaga, the main source for visnagin, has been used in traditional medicine in the Middle East to ease urinary tract pain associated with kidney stones and to promote stone passage.

Occurrences
Visnagin naturally occurs in Ammi visnaga, a species of flowering plant in the carrot family known by many common names, including bisnaga, toothpickweed, and khella. Visnagin-containing khella seeds are usually found mainly in Middle East countries such as Egypt and Turkey and also in Northern African countries such as Morocco. Visnagin can be extracted directly from khella seeds.

Synthesis
Modified synthesis of the naturally occurring visnagin is reported. Starting from phloroghrcin aldehyde, and building on the 2-methyl-y-pyrone, 2-methyl-5,7-dihydroxy-dfo-yl-chromone was obtained. Construction of the furan moiety was realized by a conventional method through the 7-carboxymethoxy ether giving S-norvisnagin which can be methylated to visnagin.

Reactions

Condensation 
Visnagin analogs can be synthesized through the condensation of visnagone with esters and sodium. This leads to the product of 2-ethyl, 2-(3'-pyridyl) visnagin analog (50c).

Oligomerization 
Visnagin molecules can go over an oligomerization to form a chain of visnagin molecules.

Animal study
Visnagin has biological activity in animal models as a vasodilator and reduces blood pressure by inhibiting calcium influx into the cell. In rats, visnagin prevents the formation of kidney stones by prolonging the induction time of nucleation of crystals.

On December 8, 2014, it was reported that "visnagin protects against doxorubicin-induced cardiomyopathy through modulation of mitochondrial malate dehydrogenase."

References

External links

Benzofuran ethers at the benzene ring
Furanochromones